Patricia Kenworthy Nuckols (June 21, 1921 – January 17, 2022) was an American field hockey player and a pilot in the Women Airforce Service Pilots (WASP) during World War II. Prior to her marriage in 1948, she was known by her maiden name, Patricia Kenworthy.

WASP service
She managed to pass muster by "standing up exceedingly straight and generally brazening it out." She claimed to be five feet two-and-a-half inches and, training in the back seat of a Steerman, she used three pillows to see over the training pilot in the front seat. She was one of 1,800 women who were accepted into the WASP program. She was assigned to the Blytheville Army Air Field.

The WASP pilots were not recognized as military pilots until the 1970s. In 2010, Nuckols and approximately 200 other WASP pilots received the Congressional Gold Medal for their wartime service. The Vermont Legislature also passed a resolution honoring Nuckols for "her extraordinary military service as a World War II flying WASP."

Field hockey player
Kenworthy was also a star field hockey player. In November 1940, she was selected as a first-team left back on the All-America women's field hockey team. She was also selected as a reserve player on the 1939 All-America team and as a first-team All-American in 1941.

She resumed playing field hockey as a center halfback after the war and traveled to Europe in 1948 as part of the U.S. national team. In 1988, she became one of the charter inductees into the USA Field Hockey Hall of Fame.

Personal life
Kenworthy Nuckols was born on June 21, 1921, in Philadelphia, Pennsylvania. She was married in 1948 to E. Marshall Nuckols, who became a senior executive at Campbell Soup Company. She died in Manchester, Vermont, on January 17, 2022, at the age of 100.

References

1921 births
2022 deaths
21st-century American women
American female field hockey players
Women Airforce Service Pilots personnel
Congressional Gold Medal recipients
American centenarians
Women centenarians
Field hockey players from Philadelphia
Military personnel from Philadelphia